There are at least 34 named lakes and reservoirs in Logan County, Arkansas.

Lakes
	Keenan Lake, el.  
	Lake Takima, el.  
	Scott Lake, el.

Reservoirs
	Blue Mountain Lake, el.  
	Boneville Lake, el.  
	Booneville Lake, el.  
	Booneville Reservoir, el.  
	Caney Lake, el.  
	Cove Lake, el.  
	Fletcher Lake, el.  
	Hewitt Lake, el.  
	Hope Lake, el.  
	Lake Dardanelle, el.  
	Lake Number Eight, el.  
	Lake Number Three, el.  
	Lake Number Two, el.  
	Owens Lake, el.  
	Paris Reservoir, el.  
	Parker Lake, el.  
	Sixmile Creek Watershed Site 10 Reservoir, el.  
	Sixmile Creek Watershed Site 11 Reservoir, el.  
	Sixmile Creek Watershed Site 12 Reservoir, el.  
	Sixmile Creek Watershed Site Five Reservoir, el.  
	Sixmile Creek Watershed Site Four Reservoir, el.  
	Sixmile Creek Watershed Site Nine Reservoir, el.  
	Sixmile Creek Watershed Site Seven Reservoir, el.  
	Sixmile Creek Watershed Site Three Reservoir, el.  
	Sixmile Creek Watershed Site Two Reservoir, el.  
	Subiaco Reservoir, el.  
	Subiaco Reservoir, el.  
	Tritt Lake, el.  
	Upper Petit Jean Site Number Nine Reservoir, el.  
	Watson Lake, el.  
	Williams Lake, el.

See also

 List of lakes in Arkansas

Notes

Bodies of water of Logan County, Arkansas
Logan